Gällstad is a locality situated in Ulricehamn Municipality, Västra Götaland County, Sweden with 471 inhabitants in 2010.

Sports
The following sports clubs are located in Gällstad:

 Gällstads FK

Notable people
 J. Hugo Aronson, American politician, born there in 1891

References 

Populated places in Västra Götaland County
Populated places in Ulricehamn Municipality